Nobody's Boy is a musical theatre production of 1919, produced in London's West End.

Writers and productions
The libretto by John P. Wilson is based on The Foundling by William Lestocq and E. M. Robson. Music is by Edward A. Horan, who was a 21-year-old American.

The first production ran at the Garrick Theatre from 9 July to 2 August 1919, with William J. Wilson as director, Jack Haskell as choreographer, and Arthur E. Godfrey as musical director. It had a run at the Garrick of only 32 performances, so was deemed to have flopped.

A further production was staged at the Empire Theatre, Sheffield, at Christmas 1920, with Daisy Burrell reprising the role of Mollie Maybud.

Plot
The young Dr Randall and his bride were on their honeymoon in Brighton in 1894 when they found a baby boy abandoned on their bed, so adopted him and brought him up. Twenty-five years on, Dick Randall is engaged to Rose Bunting, but her parents, Colonel and Mrs Bunting, have been told the story of his origins and insist Dick must find at least one parent, or the wedding is off. Dick has a series of adventures in his search: he believes Mollie Maybud, a cabaret singer, is his sister, but she turns out to be a girlfriend  of Colonel Bunting. Dick saves Alice Hawkins from marrying Bradbury Bitters, as she is in love with Jack Foster; he then believes Alice's aunt, another Mrs Bunting, is his mother, as she had lost a “little one” in the same hotel, but this turns out to have been a pet monkey. Finally, Dr Randall produces a document which the Bunting family accept as giving Dick a respectable background.

Originating cast
Donald Calthrop as Dick Randall
Marjorie Gordon as Rose Bunting
Jack Sinclair as Bridegroom
Clifton Alderson as Dr Randall
Johnny Dale as Reggie Fairfax
Frank Lalor as Colonel Bunting
Daisy Burrell as Mollie Maybud
Amy Augarde as Mrs Bunting  
Doris Chard as Alice Hawkins
Eddie Morris as Bradbury Bitters
Fred Hearne as Jack Foster
Kitty Lister as "Mother's Boy"

Notes

References
J. P. Wearing, The London Stage 1910–1919: A Calendar of Productions, Performers, and Personnel (London: Scarecrow Press, 1982)

British musicals
1919 musicals